Steve Lott (January 17, 1950-November 6, 2021) was the CEO of Boxing Hall of Fame Las Vegas Nevada, boxing manager, former film editor at ESPN, and assistant to fight managers of the time Bill Cayton and Jim Jacobs, who financed Mike Tyson's boxing coach and life mentor Cus D'Amato, boxing film historian.

On November 6, 2021, it was announced on the Boxing Hall of Fame Las Vegas Facebook page that founder and CEO Steve Lott died peacefully in his sleep surrounded by his loved ones.

Career
He was an executive producer at the Big Fights, Inc., and assistant manager of ten fighters, including five world champions.

Over a thirty-year span at Big Fights, Inc. 1972 – 1998, beginning as a film editor and culminating as executive producer, he had hands-on experience with every frame of what is now the ESPN/Classic Sports film and tape library.

As the assistant manager and then manager of over ten fighters, he has built relationships with the leading members of the boxing press, as well as many noted trainers, boxers, referees, promoters, and boxing celebrities. He also assisted such venues as the South Street Seaport Museum and National Museum of American Jewish History with the development of boxing exhibits. He  appeared on Larry King Live and in many boxing documentaries and TV specials.

Filmography
 Fallen Champ: The Untold Story of Mike Tyson (1993) 
 Ali vs. Frazier: The Fight of the Century
 Knockout (1977)
 The Garden's Defining Moments 
 Thrilla in Manila

References

Sources
 
 
 
 
 
 

1950 births
Living people
Boxing managers
Mike Tyson
American film editors